The Roundup was a weekday afternoon program on the Radio One network of the Canadian Broadcasting Corporation, hosted by Tetsuro Shigematsu and Bill Richardson at different times. It was heard Monday to Friday from 2:00 to 4:00 p.m. (2:30 to 4:30 in Newfoundland). The show mixed music with calls and letters from listeners, which were often comic in nature, and feature interviews. The show was produced by CBU in Vancouver.

The show was originally hosted by Bill Richardson and called Richardson's Roundup. It was created in 1997 to replace Vicki Gabereau's show, when she left to do a television show with CTV. Tetsuro Shigematsu, an occasional guest host, became the show's permanent host in 2004 when Richardson left to launch the new series Bunny Watson.

The phone number (723 4628) was to be 1 888 RADIO2U but when they realised how cumbersome that would be to explain, they looked for alternative spellings.  Richardson discovered that the show's phone number accidentally spelled out the phrase "sad goat" and 1-888-SAD GOAT was born.  A goat named Sadie became the symbol for the show and the concept was elaborated on from then on.

In 2005, the show was cancelled and replaced with Freestyle.

CBC Radio One programs